Communication Research is a bimonthly peer-reviewed academic journal that covers the field of communication studies and explores the processes, antecedents, and consequences of communication in a broad range of societal systems. The editors-in-chief are Silvia Knobloch-Westerwick (Ohio State University) and Jennifer Gibbs (University of California, Santa Barbara). It was established 1974 and is  published by SAGE Publishing.

Abstracting and indexing
The journal is abstracted and indexed in EBSCO databases, ERIC, ProQuest databases, Scopus, and the Social Sciences Citation Index. According to the Journal Citation Reports, its 2017 impact factor is 3.391, ranking it 3rd out of 84 journals in the category "Communication".

References

External links

SAGE Publishing academic journals
English-language journals
Bimonthly journals
Publications established in 1974
Communication journals